Body-on-frame, also known as ladder frame construction, is a common motor vehicle construction method, whereby a separate body or coach is mounted on a strong and relatively rigid vehicle frame or chassis that carries the powertrain (the engine and drivetrain) and to which the wheels and their suspension, brakes, and steering are mounted. While this was the original method of building automobiles, body-on-frame construction is now used mainly for heavy trucks, pickups, and predominantly large SUVs.

In the late 19th century the frames, like those of the carriages they replaced, might be made of wood (commonly ash), reinforced by steel flitch plates – but in the early 20th century steel ladder frames or chassis rapidly became standard. Mass production of all-metal bodies began with the Budd Company and the Dodge Brothers. Mass production of all-metal bodies became general in the 1920s but Europe, with exceptions, followed almost a decade later. Europe's custom-made or "coachbuilt" cars usually contained some wood framing or used aluminium alloy castings. Towards the beginning of international automobile assembly and construction, most manufacturers created rolling chassis consisting of a powertrain, suspension, steering column and a fuel tank that was then sent to a coachbuilder that added the body, interior and upholstery to the customers specific requests.

In contrast, unibody or monocoque designs, where panels within the body supported the car on its suspension, were developed by European manufacturers in the late 1920s with Budd USA (which had a number of large factories in Europe) and its technical knowhow. Because of the high cost of designing and developing these structures and the high cost of specialised machinery to make the large pressings required by this style of construction it is not used by low-volume manufacturers, who might construct an equivalent by welding steel tube to form a suitable space frame.

History 

The Ford Model T carried the tradition of body-on-frame over from horse-drawn buggies, helping to facilitate high volume manufacturing on a moving assembly line. In the United States, frequent changes in automotive design made it necessary to use a ladder frame rather than unibody construction to make it possible to change the design without having to change the chassis, allowing frequent changes and improvements to the car's bodywork and interior (where they were most noticeable to customers) while leaving the chassis and driveline unchanged, and thus keeping costs down and design times short. It was also easy to use the same chassis and driveline for several very different cars. Especially in the days before computer-aided design, this was an advantage.

Most small passenger vehicles switched to unibody construction by the end of the 1930s. The trend had started with cars like the Citroën Traction Avant (1934) and Opel Olympia (a General Motors design) introduced in 1935, and the Chrysler Airflow. Trucks, bus manufacturers and large low volume cars or those made in the United States continued to use separate bodies on "conventional" frames. Body-on-frame remains the preferred construction method for heavy-duty commercial vehicles (especially those intended to carry or pull heavy loads, such as trucks and some sport utility vehicles (SUVs)) but as production volumes rise increasing numbers of SUVs and crossover SUVs are switching to unibody frames. Mass-market manufacturers Ford, General Motors and Chrysler are abandoning true body-on-frame SUVs, opting, when sales volume permits, for more efficient unibody construction. Toyota currently manufactures the most body-on-frame SUVs with the 4Runner, Sequoia, Land Cruiser, Lexus GX and LX followed by Nissan with the Patrol, Armada, and Infiniti QX56/80.

Examples
The following is a list of production cars, SUVs, and light-duty pickup trucks that currently have a body-on-frame construction. The list is divided by vehicle category.

See also
 Backbone chassis
 C-channel
 Coachwork
 Exoskeleton car
 Skateboard (automotive platform)
 Space frame
 Subframe
 Superleggera

References

External links
 Ford assembly line featuring body-on-frame car (historic)

Automotive chassis types
Structural system
Structural engineering